Johanna Larsson (born 17 August 1988) is a Swedish former tennis player. In her career, she won two singles and 14 doubles titles on the WTA Tour, as well as 13 singles and 17 doubles titles on the ITF Women's Circuit. Her career-high WTA rankings are 45 in singles, achieved in September 2016, and 20 in doubles, set on 30 October 2017.

In 2017, Larsson qualified for the WTA Finals for the first time, with her partner Kiki Bertens, reaching the final in Singapore upsetting fourth seeds Barty and Dellacqua and second seeds Vesnina and Makarova. They lost in the final against Tímea Babos and Andrea Hlaváčková. Larsson made her debut for the Sweden Fed Cup team in 2005, eventually accumulating an overall win–loss record of 50–30.

Early career
Larsson began playing international tennis on the ITF Junior Circuit, with a career-high junior world ranking at No. 79 in September 2006. During the Fed Cup in 2005 she made a significant career achievement when defeating Anna Kremer. Larsson went on to defeat Brenda Schultz-McCarthy and Joanna Sakowicz. She was awarded a wild card for a WTA event In Stockholm, beating Kristina Barrois in three sets before losing to Swedish No. 1, Sofia Arvidsson in a close match. Towards the end of 2006, Larsson suffered an injured hamstring, made a came back in early 2007, and played mainly in the USA. She won the $10k Falkenberg title in back to back seasons. She returned to Fed Cup in 2007, losing to Maša Zec Peškirič and beating Vojislava Lukić and Naomi Cavaday, both ranked in the top 300, giving Sweden 9th place.

2008
2008 was Larsson's breakthrough year, with wins in two $25k events in Stockholm and in Sutton. She also made her Grand Slam debut at the French Open where she made the second qualifying round. She went on to make the second qualifying round at Wimbledon and the US Open final qualifying round. In September, she also captured the $75k Shrewsbury doubles event. She ended the season playing Swedish team tennis for Helsingborg alongside Sofia Arvidsson.

2009
Larsson began the year at the Australian Open, where she lost in the first qualifying round. She was included in the 2009 Swedish Fed Cup team, along with Sofia Arvidsson, Sandra Roma and Ellen Allgurin. She recorded a 3–1 singles win–loss record (including a win over top-70 player Monica Niculescu), and a 2–1 doubles win–loss ratio. After the Fed Cup, she travelled to South America to play qualifying in two WTA events. In Bogotá, she had three wins in qualifying taking her into the main draw where she lost to Carla Suárez Navarro. In her next tournament in Acapulco, she was forced to retire with a knee injury while trailing top seed Ágnes Szávay one set down. A series of $25k clay tournaments saw Larsson reach two finals, a semi- and a quarterfinal. Sge took the singles and doubles titles at the $50k event in Barnstaple, her best singles result in her career until then. She then took another singles title at the $25k event in Glasgow. The following week, she made the final in Istanbul before losing to Maret Ani.

2010
2010 was Larsson's first top-100 season. She started the year playing two $25k events in the United States; in the first tournament in Plantation, she made the final knocking out top seed Maret Ani en route. She was beaten in the final by Ajla Tomljanović. In the second event in Lutz, she made the quarterfinals where she was defeated by Mariana Duque. She stayed unbeaten in singles and doubles throughout the four ties she played in Fed Cup, Sweden won promotion to the World Group II playoffs. Unseeded at the $50k tournament in Biberach, Larsson was the winner. She captured her tenth ITF singles title in Clearwater, Florida.

Larsson made her Grand Slam main-draw debut at French Open; in the first round she defeated Anastasija Sevastova before losing to Akgul Amanmuradova in the second. Following Roland Garros she played the $100k tournament in Marseille. She reached the final but lost to Klára Zakopalová. She won the doubles title with Yvonne Meusburger. She then fell in the first round of qualifying at Wimbledon.

Larsson then fell in the first round of the Swedish Open to Renata Voráčová. At the Prague Open, she reached her first WTA Tour quarterfinal after the withdrawal of top seed Lucie Šafářová in the second round, but fell to Barbora Záhlavová-Strýcová in the quarterfinals.

Larsson then continued her form at the Slovenia Open, as she defeated eighth-seeded compatriot Sofia Arvidsson in the first round and Maria Elena Camerin in the second. Then in the quarterfinals she caused a bigger upset, defeating third seed Anastasia Pavlyuchenkova and Ksenia Pervak to reach her first WTA Tour final. However, she lost to Anna Chakvetadze in straight sets. After this tournament, she reached a new career-high ranking of world No. 66. She competed in the İstanbul Cup and defeated eighth seed Patty Schnyder in the first round. In Quebec City, she won her first WTA Tour doubles title with Sofia Arvidsson.

2011
Larsson began 2011 with three consecutive losses in Auckland, Hobart and at the Australian Open. She also lost in the second round of a $25k event in Stockholm before an improvement in form saw her make it to the semifinals of the Abierto Mexicano. She defeated Li Na in the second round in Miami, before losing to Alexandra Dulgheru. In the lead up to the French Open, she made a semifinal appearance in Estoril losing to Kristina Barrois. She defeated former French Open Champion Ana Ivanovic in three sets at the French Open, but lost in the second round to Ekaterina Makarova.

At the Swedish Open, Larsson beat Alla Kudryavtseva in the first round. She then defeated Vera Dushevina and Lourdes Domínguez Lino, winning both matches in three sets. In the semifinals, she easily beat Sofia Arvidsson to advance to her second WTA Tour final, which she lost to eighth seed Polona Hercog, in straight sets. She repeated her Wimbledon result, losing in the first round of the US Open.

2012
In a repeat of 2011, Larsson lost in the first round of her opening three events. She posted a 3–6 win–loss record between the tournaments of Memphis and Estoril. Her first quarterfinal of the year occurred in Strasbourg where she lost to Francesca Schiavone. A second quarterfinal was recorded two tournaments later, this time in Bad Gastein. Following a first-round exit at Wimbledon, Larsson took a wildcard into a $100k event. She defeated the fourth, sixth and third seeds en route to taking the title. Larsson then reached the semifinals of Sony Swedish Open in Båstad, losing to Mathilde Johansson. In the run up to the US Open, in Cincinnati, Larsson recorded a win over Marion Bartoli (ranked 11 at the time) before losing to Li Na. In the final major of the year she faced Dominika Cibulková, but despite taking the first set on a tie-break she went on to lose in three sets. She ended the year playing mostly qualifying in WTA events in Asia.

2013
Larsson began the season with a quarterfinal appearance in Auckland, beating Julia Görges in the second round. She lost in the opening major of the season to Jelena Janković. She lost in two consecutive first rounds in Memphis and Acapulco. She reached the third round at Indian Wells, after defeating 24th-ranked Anastasia Pavlyuchenkova in the second round. She struggled in the lead-up to the French Open but made the quarterfinals in Strasbourg once again. She lost to Sorana Cîrstea in the second round of the French Open. After the French Open, Larsson struggled once again; she went on to exit Wimbledon in the first round. A major improvement in form saw Larsson beat Mathilde Johansson in Båstad, to reach her second final there. Larsson made it to the final of the women's singles at the Swedish Open where she lost to 1st seed Serena Williams in straight sets, 4–6, 1–6. In the lead-up to the US Open, she lost in qualifying in three U.S. hardcourt events. She lost in the second round of the US Open for the second year in a row. In the WTA Challenger event in Ningbo, Larsson made the semifinals, losing to Bojana Jovanovski. She ended the year with a loss to country-woman Arvidsson at the ITF event in Poitiers.

2014

Larsson began the year with a second-round finish in Auckland, losing to second seed Ana Ivanovic. She lost in the first round of Australian Open to Victoria Azarenka. She then had her best ever indoor result at a WTA Tour event when she qualified and made the second round in Paris. Two first-round losses occurred in Rio and Florianpolis. Her drop in ranking meant she played qualifying in both Indian Wells and Miami; she failed to qualify in either event. She made a quarterfinal appearance at the ITF event in Osprey, and took her 16th ITF doubles title with Kiki Bertens at the ITF event in Cagnes-sur-Mer.

2015: First WTA singles title
Larsson won her first WTA Tour singles title at the 2015 Swedish Open.

2020: Retirement 
She retired from the professional tour on 28 February 2020.

Career statistics

Grand Slam tournament performance timeline

References

External links

 
 
 

1988 births
Living people
People from Boden Municipality
Swedish female tennis players
Olympic tennis players of Sweden
Tennis players at the 2016 Summer Olympics
LGBT tennis players
Swedish LGBT sportspeople
Sportspeople from Norrbotten County
Lesbian sportswomen